Desmopuntius trifasciatus is a species of cyprinid fish endemic to Indonesia where it can be found in dark, slowly flowing blackwater rivers.  This species can reach a length of  SL.

References 

Desmopuntius
Freshwater fish of Indonesia
Fish described in 1996